Two-Legged Horse (Asbe du-pa) is a 2008 film directed by Samira Makhmalbaf and written by Mohsen Makhmalbaf. The film is about a one-legged child that hires another poor child to carry him around on his back. The film was filmed in and takes place in Afghanistan.

Plot 
A poor boy has to compete with other poor children to find a job. The winner is the child who is better able to pick up a child who lost his legs in the war to go to school. The race begins and the poor boy wins. For $1 a day, the boy picks up a stray boy like a horse every day and takes him to and from school. When he has him on his back, he races with donkeys and horses roaming the streets. He takes him to the bathroom at home and rides him, but the helpless boy is unhappy with him, because he has not yet gotten a horse the way he wants.

Awards 
Special Mention Award from the 2008 Rome International Film Festival, Italy
Georges Delerue Award for Best Soundtrack (composed by Tolib Shakhidi) at the 2008 Ghent International Film Festival, Belgium. 
Special Jury Prize from the 56th San Sebastian International Film Festival, Spain 2008

References 

2008 films
2000s Persian-language films
Films directed by Samira Makhmalbaf
Films about disability